James Allen Worthy (born March 28, 1992) is an American record producer, singer, songwriter and entrepreneur. Worthy's production, and work includes various recording artists like Fetty Wap, 6LACK, Truth Hurts, Robin S, and 112.

Early life
Born in Queens, New York, he moved with his family to Atlanta as a teenager. His parents were both in the entertainment and travel industry. At age 16 he began self teaching himself how to craft music production which led him to his first publishing contract with Sony. Shortly after he attended Art Institute of Atlanta where he earned a bachelor's degree in audio production.

Career 
Worthy came to prominence working, producing, and writing for artists such as J Holiday, Robin S., Kurupt, Yung Berg, and many others. His work includes songs like "Fight 4 Love" by Truth Hurts, "1 & Only" by Jhonni Blaze & Fetty Wap, "Drip" by Sammie & J Young MDK. In 2017, Worthy has also pursued acting, and has been featured on "Access Hollywood", and appeared on BET's docu series "From the Bottom Up" Season 1. Later in 2017 he joined the duo group Kings X2 where they released their debut single "Wine For Me". The song peaked at number 10 on the Billboard Hot Singles Chart.

In 2021, Worthy announced an investment into British Sports and Entertainment company "3 Kingdoms Group". Following up to 2022 Worthy founded "Tasty Notes Events" which is an upscale event brand.

Solo
Worthy embarked on a career as a performer. His debut EP, "Blu Leisure", was released January 11, 2019 through Empire Distribution. Worthy's debut single was entitled "Move" which featured Whodini. On January 17, 2020, Worthy released his sophomore EP "Kaleidoscopes" which was co executive produced by PM Dawn. The lead single for Worthy's 2020 release was titled "This Wave". Following up to 2022 he released a dance house single entitled "See It My Way" which features dance singer Robin S. The song peaked at #1 on the iTunes Dance Single Chart upon its release.

Production discography

EPs

Singles

As Lead Artist

As Featured Artist

Television appearances

Filmography
2017: Love by Chance

References

External links 
 
 

1992 births
Living people
American hip hop record producers
African-American record producers
Record producers from New York (state)
African-American songwriters
Songwriters from New York (state)
African-American male rappers
21st-century American rappers
21st-century American male musicians
21st-century African-American musicians
American male songwriters